Greenbacks were emergency paper currency issued by the United States during the American Civil War that were printed in green on the back. They were in two forms: Demand Notes, issued in 1861–1862, and United States Notes, issued in 1862–1865. A form of fiat money, the notes were legal tender for most purposes and carried varying promises of eventual payment in coin, but were not backed by existing gold or silver reserves.

History

Background
Before the Civil War, the United States used gold and silver coins as its official currency. Paper currency in the form of banknotes was issued by privately-owned banks, the notes being redeemable for specie at the bank's office. Such notes had value only if the bank could be counted on to redeem them; if a bank failed, its notes became worthless. The federal government sometimes issued Treasury Notes to borrow money during periods of economic distress, but proposals for a federal paper currency were politically contentious and recalled the experience of the Continental dollars issued during the American Revolution. These were nominally payable in silver, but rapidly depreciated due to British counterfeiting and the Continental Congress's difficulty in collecting money from the states.

The Buchanan administration had run chronic deficits as the country weathered the Panic of 1857. The southern secession movement worsened the situation, as the government lost substantial tax revenue. It continued to operate during the presidential transition on private bank loans at rates up to 12 percent, with some banks asking as much as 36. Salmon P. Chase, as the Treasury secretary of the incoming Lincoln administration, found the banks more receptive but struggled to keep enough coins in the Treasury to meet expenditures.

Demand Notes

The first measure to finance the war occurred in July 1861, when Congress authorized $50,000,000 in Demand Notes. They bore no interest but could be redeemed for specie "on demand." They were not legal tender before March 1862 but, like Treasury Notes, could be used to pay customs duties. Unlike state and some private banknotes, Demand Notes were printed on both sides. The reverse side was printed in green ink, so Demand Notes were dubbed "greenbacks." Initially, they were discounted relative to gold, but being fully redeemable in gold, they were soon at par. In December 1861, the government had to suspend redemption, and the Demand Notes declined. Chase authorized paying interest on Demand Notes, which sustained their value. 

The later United States Notes could not be used to pay customs duties or interest on the public debt, which could be paid only by gold and Demand Notes. Importers, therefore, continued to use Demand Notes in place of gold. In March 1862, Demand Notes were made legal tender. As Demand Notes were used to pay duties, they were taken out of circulation. By mid-1863, about 95% were gone.

United States Notes

The number of Demand Notes issued was far insufficient to meet the war expenses of the government but even so was not supportable.

The solution came from Colonel "Dick" Taylor, an Illinois businessman who was serving as a volunteer officer. Taylor met with Lincoln in January 1862 and suggested issuing unbacked paper money. Issuing unbacked paper money was not an idea that Lincoln really liked, but there was mounting pressure in Congress to do something. The government could either print its own money or go into deep perpetual debt to foreign creditors. That made President quickly endorse Taylor's proposal. On February 25, 1862, Congress passed the first Legal Tender Act, which authorized the issuance of $150 million in United States Notes.

Since the reverse of the notes was printed with green ink, they were called "greenbacks" by the public and considered to be equivalent to the Demand Notes, which were already known as such. The United States Notes were issued by the United States to pay for labor and goods.

Earlier, Secretary Chase had the slogan "In God We Trust" engraved on U.S. coins. During a cabinet meeting, there was some discussion of adding it to the U.S. Notes as well. Lincoln, however, humorously remarked, "If you are going to put a legend on the greenbacks, I would suggest that of Peter and Paul, 'Silver and gold I have none, but such as I have I give to thee.

California and Oregon defied the Legal Tender Act. Gold was more available on the West Coast, and merchants in those states did not want to accept U.S. Notes at face value. They blacklisted people who tried to use them at face value. California banks would not accept greenbacks for deposit, and the state would not accept them for payment of taxes. Both states ruled that greenbacks were a violation of their state constitutions.

As the government issued hundreds of millions in greenbacks, their value against gold declined. The decline was substantial, but was nothing like the collapse of the continental dollar.

In 1862, the greenback declined against gold until by December, gold had become at a 29% premium. By spring of 1863, the greenback declined further, to 152 against 100 dollars in gold. However, after the Union victory at Gettysburg, the greenback recovered to 131 dollars to 100 in gold. In 1864, it declined again, as Grant was making little progress against Lee, who held strong in Richmond throughout most of the war. The greenback's low point came in July that year, with 258 greenbacks equal to 100 gold. When the war ended in April 1865 the greenback made another remarkable recovery to 150. The recovery began when Congress limited the total issue of greenback dollars to $450 million. The greenbacks rose in value until December 1878, when they became on par with gold. Greenbacks then became freely convertible into gold.

Complete set of 1862–63 greenbacks

See also 

Early American currency
Promissory note

Notes

References

Sources

 

 Vol.I Vol.II
 Vol.I Vol.II

Further reading

1861 establishments in the United States
1865 disestablishments in the United States
Currencies introduced in 1861
Historical currencies of the United States
Economic history of the American Civil War
Paper money of the United States
Banknotes of the United States